Mary Louise Farrell Palmer (November 27, 1942  – October 20, 2011), known professionally as Aniko Farrell, was a Canadian singer, actress and Miss Dominion of Canada.

Farrell was one of nine children born to Arthur and Elizabeth Farrell in St. John's, Newfoundland. She was educated at Holy Heart of Mary Regional High School and started to sing at an early age. She won several awards at the Kiwanis Music Festival. In 1964 Farrell was voted Miss Newfoundland and won Miss Dominion of Canada later that same year. She went on to enter the Miss World contest where she was the runner-up.

Farrell made guest appearances on The Lawrence Welk Show and was offered a contract to appear regularly on the show. She used her stage name Aniko when performing in Broadway musicals. It was there in 1966 where she met Peter Palmer, whom she married later that year in Los Angeles. The couple had a daughter, Farrell Beth, and lived in Florida until her death in 2011.

See also
 List of people of Newfoundland and Labrador

References

External links
 Mary Louise Farrell - Encyclopedia of Newfoundland and Labrador, v. 2, p. 18

1942 births
2011 deaths
Actresses from Newfoundland and Labrador
Canadian beauty pageant winners
Canadian musical theatre actresses
Canadian stage actresses
Miss World 1964 delegates
Musicians from St. John's, Newfoundland and Labrador
Canadian people of Irish descent
Canadian emigrants to the United States
20th-century Canadian women singers
Miss Universe 1964 contestants